Castleboro House is a former stately home in Clonroche, County Wexford, Ireland.  It was built in 1770 by Robert Shapland Carew, father of Robert Carew, 1st Baron Carew, who was an Irish Whig Party politician and landowner. 

The mansion has a troubled history. An accidental fire took place in 1840 and destroyed all but the west wing.  It was rebuilt in 1858 and survived until 1923, when it was burnt down by local IRA (Irish Republican Army) supporters. The remaining estate was later converted to farmland and the ruins of the house still stand today.

References

External links
 Castleboro House An Taisce
 National Inventory of Architectural Heritage Department of Arts, Heritage and the Gaeltacht

Country houses in Ireland
Houses completed in 1770
1770 establishments in Ireland
Buildings and structures destroyed by arson